USS Burrows (DD-29) was a modified  in the United States Navy during World War I and later in the United States Coast Guard, designated (CG-10). She was the second ship named for Lieutenant William Ward Burrows II.

Burrows was launched on 23 June 1910 by New York Shipbuilding Company, Camden, New Jersey, sponsored by Miss Lorna Dorthea Burrows, a relative of Lieutenant Burrows, and commissioned on 21 February 1911.

United States Navy
Prior to World War I, Burrows was attached to the Torpedo Flotilla, Atlantic Fleet, and operated along the east coast and in Cuban waters, performing tactical maneuvers, war games, torpedo practice, and gunnery. Early in 1916, Burrows was assigned to the Neutrality Patrol in the Staten Island–Long Island area of New York. When the United States entered World War I, Burrows patrolled the Lower Harbor, New York. On 7 April 1917, she reported to Commander, Squadron 2, Patrol Force, and carried out an unfruitful search for a German raider reported in the vicinity of Nantucket, Massachusetts. On 10 April, she was detached from Squadron 2 and reported to Philadelphia Navy Yard, where she was fitted out for distant service.

In June, she sailed from New York with Group 2, Cruiser and Transport Force, to escort the convoy which carried the first American Expeditionary Force to reach France. She arrived in the Loire River on 27 June 1917, and was assigned to patrol the south coast of Ireland, operating out of Queenstown, Ireland. Burrows patrolled; escorted convoys; answered Allied distress calls; landed survivors; and fought enemy submarines that hunted in the English Channel. On one occasion, she was in trouble with a broken oil line, which caused a fire on board. Four other destroyers assisted her in putting it out, but two crew members lost their lives. With the cessation of hostilities, she performed various duties at Brest, France, and was present at the reception of President Woodrow Wilson on 13 December 1918, when  and escort arrived.

Burrows arrived at Philadelphia on 2 January 1919. She operated along the eastern seaboard for several months, and in June reported to Philadelphia Navy Yard. Burrows was decommissioned on 12 December 1919.

United States Coast Guard
In June 1924, she was transferred to the Treasury Department for use by the Coast Guard. She was based in New London, Connecticut as part of the Rum Patrol.

Burrows was returned to the Navy on 2 May 1931. Burrows was later scrapped in accordance with the London Naval Treaty.

References

 

Paulding-class destroyers
World War I destroyers of the United States
Ships built by New York Shipbuilding Corporation
1910 ships